Helena Fibingerová (born 13 July 1949 in Víceměřice, Olomouc Region) is a Czech shot putter who won an Olympic bronze medal in 1976 and became World champion in 1983. She also set three world records.

World records
 21.57 metres on 21 September 1974 in Gottwaldov
 21.99 metres on 26 July 1976 in Opava
 22.32 metres on 20 August 1977 in Nitra

Her latest record stood until 2 May 1980, when East German Ilona Slupianek improved it by four centimetres.

Fibingerová still holds the indoor world record with 22.50 metres, achieved on 19 February 1977 in Jablonec nad Nisou.

International competitions

Personal life
Fibingerová is a friend of Jana Nečasová, the former Czech Prime Minister's wife. She testified in court as a character witness in defence of Nečasová in relation to the 2013 Czech political corruption scandal, in which Nečasová and her husband stood accused.

References

1949 births
Living people
People from Prostějov District
Czechoslovak female shot putters
Czech female shot putters
Olympic female shot putters
Olympic athletes of Czechoslovakia
Olympic bronze medalists for Czechoslovakia
Olympic bronze medalists in athletics (track and field)
Athletes (track and field) at the 1972 Summer Olympics
Athletes (track and field) at the 1976 Summer Olympics
World Athletics Championships athletes for Czechoslovakia
World Athletics Championships medalists
European Athletics Championships medalists
World record setters in athletics (track and field)
Recipients of Medal of Merit (Czech Republic)
World Athletics indoor record holders
World Athletics Championships winners
Medalists at the 1976 Summer Olympics
Friendship Games medalists in athletics
Sportspeople from the Olomouc Region